Chicoric acid (also known as cichoric acid) is a hydroxycinnamic acid, an organic compound of the phenylpropanoid class and occurs in a variety of plant species. It is a derivative of both caffeic acid and tartaric acid.

As a suitable marker for the distinction of Echinacea species, it is often assayed using RP-HPLC and Thin layer chromatography (TLC) methods.

Sources
Chicoric acid has first been isolated from Cichorium intybus (chicory) but also occurs in significant amounts in Echinacea, in particular E. purpurea, dandelion leaves, basil, lemon balm, and aquatic plants, including algae and seagrasses.

Biological functions
Chicoric acid has been shown to stimulate phagocytosis in both in vitro and in vivo studies, to inhibit the function of hyaluronidase (an enzyme that breaks down hyaluronic acid in the human body), to protect collagen from damage due to free radicals, and to inhibit the function of HIV-1 integrase.

See also 
 Caftaric acid (monocaffeyltartaric acid)

References 

Hydroxycinnamic acid esters
Tartrate esters
Catechols
Vinylogous carboxylic acids